An annular solar eclipse occurred on April 7, 1940. A solar eclipse occurs when the Moon passes between Earth and the Sun, thereby totally or partly obscuring the image of the Sun for a viewer on Earth. An annular solar eclipse occurs when the Moon's apparent diameter is smaller than the Sun's, blocking most of the Sun's light and causing the Sun to look like an annulus (ring). An annular eclipse appears as a partial eclipse over a region of the Earth thousands of kilometres wide. Annularity was visible from Gilbert and Ellice Islands (the part now belonging to Kiribati), Mexico and the United States.

Related eclipses

Solar eclipses 1939–1942

Saros 128

Metonic series

Notes

References 

1940 4 7
1940 4 7
1940 in science
April 1940 events